Marja Nutti is a former Italian artistic gymnast. She won the balance beam silver medal at the 1950 World Championships.

References

Year of birth missing (living people)
Possibly living people
Italian female artistic gymnasts
Medalists at the World Artistic Gymnastics Championships